Đurđenovac is a municipality in Slavonia, in the Osijek-Baranja County of Croatia.

In the census of 2011, there were a total of 6,750 inhabitants in the entire municipality, in the following settlements:
 Beljevina, population 712
 Bokšić, population 433
 Bokšić Lug, population 259
 Đurđenovac, population 2,944
 Gabrilovac, population 63
 Klokočevci, population 428
 Krčevina, population 115
 Ličko Novo Selo, population 96
 Lipine, population 68
 Našičko Novo Selo, population 344
 Pribiševci, population 390
 Sušine, population 278
 Šaptinovci, population 543
 Teodorovac, population 77

By ethnicity, 96.6% are Croats, 1.9% are Serbs.

References

Municipalities of Croatia
Slavonia